The McCartney Interview is a limited edition vinyl release, published in 1980 on the Parlophone label in the UK and Europe and the following year on Columbia Records in North America. The album contains an interview of Paul McCartney by journalist Vic Garbarini, recorded for the magazine Musician in May 1980. The cover photography was taken by Linda McCartney. EMI engineers added a bonus “clue” to this album. It’s a little note from Paul that appears at the end of side two, in the outgroove, just before the needle lifts. If you play the outgroove backwards, Paul says: “I’m still a Walrus.”

Track listing
Side One
 "McCartney II" 	
 Negative criticism of The Beatles and Wings
 His influences 	
 "Venus and Mars" / "Wild Life"
 "Band on the Run" 	
 Musical direction / Ringo / George / "Hey Jude"	
 "The White Album" / Tension / "Helter Skelter"	
 "Abbey Road"	
 Musical background / Trumpet, guitar, piano / Learning bass in Hamburg	
 Early Beatles mixes / Motown and Stax influences
 The "Sgt. Pepper's" story / The Beach Boys' Pet Sounds	
 "Rubber Soul" / "Revolver"
 Fame and success / Paul and John's reaction
 Stage fright during The Beatles and Wings 	
 How Wings started 	
 New wave / Early Beatles 	
 Creating The Beatles sound / "Love Me Do" and early songs

Side Two
 The Beatles' conquest of America 	
 Beatles' haircuts and image 	
 Paying dues in Hamburg & Liverpool / Early tours
 Weathering pressures / The break-up
 Video of "Coming Up"	/ Reliving the Beatle image
 Playing bass
 Lennon-McCartney songwriting	/ Dislike of formula
 Beatles' imitators 	
 "I Am the Walrus" / The black carnation / "Sgt. Pepper" LP cover
 New wave, Bowie, Ferry, Elvis
 Pop music and radio
 Getting married / Changing perspective / "Waterfalls"
 "Give Ireland Back to the Irish", "Hi, Hi, Hi" / Banned songs / Children's songs / "Mary Had a Little Lamb"

Personnel
Paul McCartney: narration
Vic Garbarini: interviewer

References

External links
 US release at Discogs.com
 The McCartney Interview at Rateyourmusic.com

Paul McCartney albums
1980 albums
Interview albums